Peter Stackpole (1913-1997) was an American photographer. Along with Alfred Eisenstaedt, Margaret Bourke-White, and Thomas McAvoy, he was one of Life Magazines first staff photographers and remained with the publication until 1960. He won a George Polk Award in 1954 for a photograph taken 100 feet underwater, and taught photography at the Academy of Art University. He also wrote a column in U.S. Camera for fifteen years. He was the son of sculptor Ralph Stackpole.

References

External links
Collection of Peter Stackpole photos at the Center for Creative Photography, University of Arizona.

American photojournalists
1913 births
1997 deaths
Social documentary photographers
Life (magazine) photojournalists
20th-century American photographers
Academy of Art University faculty